The 1929−30 French Rugby Union Championship of first division was won by Agen that defeated the Quillan in the final.

The Championship was contested by 40 clubs divided into 8 pools of five.

Some team were qualified for their results in regional championship: CASG (2nd in Paris), Libourne (4th en Côte d'Argent), FC Lyon (4th en Lyonnais) and CS Oyonnax (5th du Lyonnais).

Five new clubs  was promoted in the "Excellence" : Hendaye, Lyon OU, Oyonnax, Roanne (champion Honneur 1929) and Soustons.

They replace Stade Bagnères, Dax. Mazamet, Montauban and Racing.

First round

In  Bold the qualified teams:

 Pool A  Hendaye, Lézignan, Limoges,  Lourdes , Lyon OU
 Pool B AS Bayonne, Carcassonne, CASG,  Cognac ,  Pamiers 
 Pool C   Biarritz , Quillan , St Girons,  Vienne, Fumel
 Pool D Agen , Libourne,  Montferrand ,  US Perpignan , Soustons
 Pool E Aviron bayonnais, SBUC, Grenoble, Narbonne,  Toulouse Olymp.EC 
 Pool F Bordeaux, Le Boucau, Arlequins Perpignan , Roanne, Stadoceste
 gruppo G: Albi,  Bègles ,  Béziers , FC Lyon,  Pau 
 gruppo H:  Stade Français , Oyonnax, Périgueux, Tolone, Toulouse

Second round

In  Bold the qualified teams:

 Carcassonne , Touloun, Fumel
 Narbonne, Stadoceste, Toulouse
 Lézignan, Pau, Perpignan
 Lourdes, Montferrand, Stade Français
 Cognac, Quillan, Toulouse OEC
 Bègles, Biarritz, Grenoble
 Béziers, SA Bordeaux, US Perpignan
 Agen, Limoges, Pamiers

Quarterfinals 

(le 13 April 1930)

Semifinals 

The match Agen-Pau was signed by the death of the wing of Agen Michel Pradié (18 years), after a violent tackle.

Final

Other competitions

L'Amicale Sportive Bortoise became Champione de France Honneur (2nd division) winning in the final against  F:C: Saint-Claude 5−0.

In the Promotion Championship (3rd division), Stade Niortais beat Sporting Club Salonais 6−3.

En 4th division, the A.S. de la Bourse est French Champion beating US Mourillonnaise (Toulon) 10−3.

L'US Perpigan was winner of tournament for 2nd XV winning against the Stade Français 14−5.

Sources 
 L'Humanité, Le Figaro 1929-1930
Compte rendu de la finale de 1930, sur lnr.fr
 finalesrugby.com

1930
France
Championship